WYND (1310 AM) is a radio station broadcasting a Christian radio format. Licensed to DeLand, Florida, United States, the station serves the Daytona Beach area. The station is currently owned by Clarence and Andrea Williams, through licensee Proclaim Media Group, LLC.

History
The construction permit for this radio station was first issued to Trio Broadcasting Company on June 6, 1956, following its application in December 1955 under the callsign WOOO.  Transmitter facilities were constructed on East Taylor Road in DeLand, with studios in the Conrad Building, downtown.  The station began broadcasting January 8, 1957 at a power output of 1,000 watts, daytime only.  On June 25, 1957, the station was granted a construction permit to increase its power to 5,000 watts, daytime only.

The power increase was completed in 1958.  In November 1961, the station was sold to Polaris Broadcasting, Inc., only to later be put into receivership in September 1964.  That year, the license was transferred to receiver Brian Tolby, operating the station as Shom Broadcasters.

In October 1967, the station was granted pre-sunrise authority, which allowed it to operate at 500 watts two hours prior to local sunrise.  On May 3, 1973, the station changed its call letters to WKKX, and its ownership to DeLand Broadcasters, Incorporated.  Studios were also moved to 700 Highway 92 in DeLand, but were later re-located to 118 North Boulevard in DeLand.  In 1978, the station came under new ownership by Mid-Florida Broadcasting Company.

The station was assigned the call letters WDLF on December 22, 1980, months after coming under new ownership but the licensee name was retained as Mid-Florida Broadcasting Company briefly before the change in name to West Volusia Communications Corporation.

On April 6, 1984, not long after its sale from West Volusia Communications to John Locke, the station changed its call sign to the current WYND.  In December 1986, the station was sold to Dr. D. Stephen Hollis for $255,000 and coming under control of station general manager Buddy Tucker some years later.  At some point around this time, studios were co-located with the station's transmitter facility along East Taylor Road, and WYND was also granted limited nighttime power of 95 watts, allowing it to stay on the air around-the-clock if desired.  In 2006, WYND was granted a construction permit to increase its power to its current values.

In August 2018, Buddy Tucker Associates agreed to sell WYND to its current owner.  The FCC granted to transfer of license on October 12, 2018.

Translator
WYND is rebroadcast over F.M. translator station W241CZ.

References

External links
FCC History Cards - WYND

YND (AM)
Radio stations established in 1980
Moody Radio affiliate stations
1980 establishments in Florida